Claude Loiselle (born May 29, 1963) is a Canadian former professional ice hockey forward who played 13 seasons in the National Hockey League (NHL) from 1981 to 1994.

Playing career
As a youth, Loiselle played in the 1975 Quebec International Pee-Wee Hockey Tournament with a minor ice hockey team from East Ottawa.

Loiselle played with the Ontario Hockey League's (OHL) Windsor Spitfires and the Adirondack Red Wings of the American Hockey League (AHL) before embarking on his NHL career. Loiselle started his NHL career with the Detroit Red Wings in 1981–82 after being selected in the second round, 23rd overall in the 1981 NHL Entry Draft.

In 616 career games spent with the Detroit Red Wings, New Jersey Devils, Quebec Nordiques, Toronto Maple Leafs and New York Islanders he recorded 92 goals, 117 assists and 1,149 minutes in penalties. He also competed in 41 career NHL playoff games and was a member of two Patrick Division championship-winning teams; New Jersey in 1988 and the Islanders in 1993.

Management career
He retired after the 1993–94 NHL season. Loiselle spent seven years as Associate Director of Hockey Operations for the NHL and was involved in salary arbitration, discipline and collective bargaining, while also serving as the liaison on hockey operation matters between the NHL and the AHL. Starting in 2005, he was the Assistant General Manager for the Tampa Bay Lightning and in 2007 General Manager of the Lightning's AHL Affiliate, the Norfolk Admirals.

On May 29, 2010, Loiselle agreed to terms on a contract with the Maple Leafs as their assistant general manager, working alongside Brian Burke, the Maple Leafs' then-General Manager. He continued to serve as Assistant General Manager of the Toronto Maple Leafs and Vice President of Hockey Operations of Maple Leafs Sports and Entertainment. On July 22, 2014, the Maple Leafs announced they had fired Loiselle along with most other members of the executive management team following the removal of GM Brian Burke.

On July 31, 2015, Loiselle was hired by the Arizona Coyotes as a hockey operations consultant.

In 2016, the New York Islanders hired Loiselle as Hockey Operations Consultant and later promoted him to Vice President of Hockey Operations.

Personal life
Loiselle was born in Ottawa, Ontario. He started his undergraduate studies while playing for the Islanders in 1992 and earned his law degree from McGill University in 1998, the same year he was admitted to the New York State Bar.

Career statistics

References

External links

1963 births
Adirondack Red Wings players
Anaheim Ducks scouts
Arizona Coyotes
Canadian ice hockey centres
Detroit Red Wings draft picks
Detroit Red Wings players
Franco-Ontarian people
Ice hockey people from Ottawa
Living people
New Jersey Devils players
New York Islanders personnel
New York Islanders players
Quebec Nordiques players
Tampa Bay Lightning executives
Toronto Maple Leafs executives
Toronto Maple Leafs players
Windsor Spitfires players